Biassono is a comune (municipality) in the Province of Monza and Brianza in the Italian region Lombardy, located about  northeast of Milan.

Biassono borders the following municipalities: Lesmo, Arcore, Macherio, Lissone, Monza, Vedano al Lambro, Villasanta.

Biassono is noteworthy because of its location situated to the northwest of the Autodromo Nazionale Monza, constructed in the park of Monza's Royal Villa.
It opened in 1922, making it the oldest Grand Prix venue that the FIA Formula One World Championship still uses for the annual Gran Premio d'Italia.

Biassono is crossed by the Lambro river in San Giorgio al Lambro, a small suburb of the municipality.

Museum 
The Museum "Carlo Verri" is located in the Verri Palace; it also service as a library and the town hall.

Twin towns
 Minusio, Switzerland, since 2010

References

External links
 
 Biassono Turistic Guide

Populated places on Brianza